The Pollachi sexual assault case refers to a case of rape and extortion of numerous women by a gang in Pollachi, Coimbatore in the Indian state of Tamil Nadu. The gang would entice women into isolated places after befriending them on social media and sexually assault them and filmed the act. The videos were later used to blackmail the women for sexual favors or money. The gang came into spotlight after the family of a 19-year-old college student who claimed to had been sexually assaulted and blackmailed complained to the police. According to media accounts, at least 200 women are sexually assaulted in the very same manner and the victims were college and school teachers, doctors, higher secondary school students from all over the state. On the mobiles of the accused, police said they discovered dozens of video recordings of women being abused at a farmhouse belonging to one of the accused and some were leaked.

There were protests across the state organized by students, political parties and various organizations to bring the perpetrators to justice.

The police arrested four men who were alleged to be involved in the rape and extortion ring. The case was shifted to the Central Bureau of Investigation (CBI), another man surrendered before the judicial magistrate and confessed to raping and blackmailing women. Later the five men were sent to the Salem central prison. The CBI arrested three more men involved in the incident in January 2021 including a functionary of the All India Anna Dravida Munnetra Kazhagam (AIADMK). The CBI made minimal progress before these arrests.

The AIADMK was criticized after the arrest of its functionary, with some news reports implying that the connection to the incident runs deeper within the party. One person arrested claimed that the racket had connections with prominent party members. According to some activists and political observers, the arrests were an attempt by the CBI and the central government to arm-twist the AIADMK to ally with the Bharatiya Janata Party (BJP) and to give more seats in the seat-sharing process of the 2021 Tamil Nadu Legislative Assembly election.

Incident
On February 12, 2019, a 19-year-old college student in Pollachi received a call from an acquaintance who said he needed to speak with her alone about something important and told her to meet him near a bus stop. He invited her to get into the car with him and his friend who was also another acquaintance of hers, and assured that they would speak on the way. Two more men got in the car unexpectedly and the girl was forcibly undressed and videotaped, and a gold chain she was wearing was stolen by the four of them. They threatened her to give them sexual favors and money if they wanted it, or they would post the video online. They abandoned her in the middle of the road after she screamed and cried.

She kept the incident hidden from her family. When the men repeatedly blackmailed her and threatened to extort money from her, she chose to confide in her family. Two men involved were then tracked by her brother and his friends, who beat them up and grabbed the men's mobile phones, which included recordings of at least three other girls whom the men might have coerced. The family reported this to the Pollachi police department, along with a sexual assault and theft lawsuit.

The rape and extortion ring 
The victim's story, as well as the mobile seized from the four men, uncovered a huge racket supposed involvement of other more men. The men reportedly used fake Facebook profiles to entice women, they would make a conversation with them and befriend them. Each of the men would entice women to an isolated house or hotel, where he would either rape the women or persuade them to have sex with him. His accomplices would film the act. If it was a sexual assault, one of the companions would hop in to pose as a protector while the other men proceeded to film. The accused had already raped and videotaped other young women, according to the police report. A few video recordings of women being sexually assaulted, reportedly shot at the farmhouse, have been leaked. In these films, girls are seen pleading with the attackers for compassion.  Most were taken to a farm house belonging to one of the accused and then raped and filmed. The videos filmed in the farm house were used to later blackmail them for sexual favours and money.

According to media accounts, at least 200 women are sexually assaulted in the very same manner. There were also suspicions that young women in the region who had committed suicide in the previous year were also victims of sexual harassment by the same men. The victims were reportedly college and school teachers, doctors, higher secondary school and college students from Coimbatore, Chennai, Salem, and other areas of Tamil Nadu. Tamil news Magazine Nakkheeran reported that the racket involved about 275 girls and 1,100 videos. According to some local media, the group has been targeting women since 2013.

The Pollachi police department issued a public appeal for women who have been victimized by the gang to come forward and register a complaint.

Arrests by the police 
On February 24, 2019, the police lodged an FIR against all four men involved. On the same day as the complaint, the three men were detained. They were put into legal remand after being brought before a judicial magistrate in Pollachi. The police filed Goondas Act on the four accused. They were arrested by the police on March 10, 2019. Police arrested the secretary of the AIADMK's 'Amma Forum' in Pollachi town on March 12, 2019, for allegedly threatening and beating the victim's brother. He was expelled out of the party's primary earlier membership for allegedly attempting to defend an accused in the case. The AIADMK functionary was released on bail three days later.

Protests 

Hundreds of teachers, attorneys, and affiliates of women's groups marched throughout the state in March 2019, asking that the perpetrators be brought to justice. Government arts college students in Coimbatore and Tiruppur held a protest by skipping classes. About 300 students from different universities in Chennai took part in the demonstration. There were also protests by 250 students from Tiruvannamalai's Government Arts College. Outside the court complex in Coimbatore, lawyers staged a protest. They requested that an investigation into the case be led by a female judge from the Madras High Court. Students studying Siddha medicines in Tirunelveli also protested on March 18, 2019, by pinning black tags to their white coats. Over 300 students from Vellore's Voorhees College held a sit-in protest, shouting slogans demanding protection for women, specifically when they were away from home.

Members of the Democratic Youth Federation of India, All India Democratic Women's Association, the Students Federation of India, Dravida Munnetra Kazhagam, the Viduthalai Chiruthaigal Katchi formed a human chain in Pudukkottai demanding that the accused be brought to justice. The Dravida Munnetra Kazhagam (DMK) staged a huge protest on March 12, led by Member of Parliament, Kanimozhi. Around 1,000 college students from Pollachi and the surrounding areas held a rally calling for justice in the incident.

Central Bureau of Investigation 
The Tamil Nadu government transferred the case to the Central Bureau of Investigation (CBI) on March 12, 2019. Another person surrendered before the chief judicial magistrate court on March 25, 2019. He confessed that he raped some women with the arrested men and made videos. The CBI filed a charge sheet against five accused on 24 May 2019, claiming that they were members of an organized criminal group that communicated with one another. CBI registered two FIRs against eight accused on 28 April 2019.   The CBI visited the farm house of the accused in May 2019 and after examining the area, they confirmed one place where a young girl was sexually harassed by the group. The five men were sent to Salem Central Prison in June 2019.

The CBI arrested three more men, including AIADMK youth wing member on 6 January 2021. The CBI made minimal progress on the case before the arrest in January 2021.

An anonymous victim claimed in a recorded audio clip that a young girl died after she was gang-raped by the arrested accused and his accomplices at his farm house and later her body was buried at the back.

On February 19, the Nakkheeran reported that the CBI had confiscated a vehicle belonging to a former AIADMK councillor. The criminals reportedly used the vehicle to entice girls and then abuse them. The perpetrators reportedly exploited the women's photographs to blackmail them and send the women to powerful people in order to get money. Former Pollachi Municipal Chairman, a member of the AIADMK, was also allegedly reported to be with these woman. V. Jayaraman was said to be close to both the ex-councilor and the Municipal Chairman.

Activists and journalists reported that, despite the arrests, there appears to be no inquiry into the role of the Pollachi policemen in either assisting the ring or covering up the crime. They claimed that the police made numerous procedural errors, which allowed for the release of several important suspects, notably those with ties to the AIADMK, and made it more difficult for survivors of the incident to tell the authorities.

Politics over the incident

The AIADMK was criticized for its alleged role in the incident after the arrest of its functionary, with some news reports implying that the connection to the incident runs deeper within the party. M.K Stalin, the DMK's president, said that AIADMK leaders were attempting to protect the persons detained in the case. These allegations were gaining ground after the release of the AIADMK functionary three days after his arrest. The District Secretary of the All India Democratic Women's Association, Radhika A alleged that the AIADMK secretary was not charged with sexual assault on purpose because of his political membership.  The AIADMK's Information Technology cell lodged a separate complaint with the police, requesting that individuals propagating propaganda against the ruling party and its leaders be prosecuted. Thirunavukkarasu, the main accused, requested that the investigation be transferred to the CBI, saying that politically powerful people were engaged in the case. According to news sources in the Tamil media, the local Member of Legislative Assembly (MLA) and AIADMK Deputy Speaker V Jayaraman's son was linked to people involved in the incident. Jayaraman denied any family links to the case.

Revealing survivor's identity 
On March 1, Coimbatore SP R Pandiarajan had a televised news conference in which he announced the survivor's name which is a criminal offence by law. On March 6, police issued a press statement in which they unlawfully identified the survivor by revealing her name, educational background, and location. The survivor filed a plea with the Coimbatore District Collector, demanding that her identity be protected. The Madras High Court ordered the government of Tamil Nadu to provide an immediate compensation of ₹ 25 lakh to the survivor for "violation of her privacy, dignity, and image" in an attempt to avoid similar cases where government officials expose the name of a survivors of sexual assault. A Public Interest Litigation was lodged in the Supreme Court requesting action against  SP R Pandiarajan for revealing the name. According to Kanimozhi, the survivor's name was exposed solely to silence other women and prevent them from coming forward and reporting, she also said that the AIADMK was trying to protect the accused in the case and Kanimozhi demanded a re-investigation by the police into all female suicides in Pollachi during the last seven years. In April 2019, the state government transferred police officers involved in the case, including a Superintendent of Police who exposed the victim's identify.

2021 state elections 
Three individuals were arrested on January 20, 2021, during the approach to the 2021 Tamil Nadu elections, after the AIADMK took steps to alienate its ally Bharatiya Janta Party (BJP) of the National Democratic Alliance. Several times in 2020, the AIADMK has taken measures that have been harmful to the BJP's interests in the state. The arrests in January 2021, according to several activists and political pundits was an attempt by the CBI and the federal government to arm-twist the AIADMK into forming a coalition with the BJP in and to get more seats in the seat-sharing procedure of the 2021 Tamil Nadu Legislative Assembly elections. On February 28, a week after the CBI confiscated the vehicle that Nakkheeran reported belonged to the former AIADMK councilor, the AIADMK  formed a legislative partnership with the BJP. The BJP, which has only ever won five seats in the state's history, was handed 20 seats in the alliance.

References 

Crime in Tamil Nadu
Social history of Tamil Nadu
2019 crimes in India